Eric Bowyer was a Northern Irish footballer who played in the Irish League with Linfield, Glenavon, Bangor and Carrick Rangers in the 1960s, 1970s and 1980s. He was named as the Ulster Footballer of the Year for 1974–75.

At Linfield, he won three League titles and won the Irish Cup once.

Sources
 M. Brodie (ed.), Northern Ireland Soccer Yearbook 2009-2010, p. 102. Belfast:Ulster Tatler Publications
Irish League Footballing Greats

Association footballers from Northern Ireland
NIFL Premiership players
Ulster Footballers of the Year
Linfield F.C. players
Glenavon F.C. players
Bangor F.C. players
Brantwood F.C. players
Dungannon Swifts F.C. players
Carrick Rangers F.C. players
Linfield F.C. managers
Living people
Northern Ireland amateur international footballers
Association footballers not categorized by position
Year of birth missing (living people)
Football managers from Northern Ireland